The Bundjalung National Park is a  national park located on the north coast of New South Wales, Australia,  north-east of Sydney.  It protects an area of coastal plain, heathland and solitary beaches between the towns of Iluka and Evans Head.

The park features coffee rock formations that can be found on the beaches at its northern end.

Background
Along the Iluka peninsula coast at the southern end of the park are a number of closely spaced headlands that create small crescent shaped beaches of white sand.  Each headland features rock platforms cut by waves and contain rock pools that are havens for intertidal marine life.

The park is named for the Bundjalung Aboriginal nation, the original occupiers of the land.

Facilities in the park include camping areas at Black Rocks (a nature-based camping area with minimal facilities, adjacent to Ten Mile Beach) and at Woody Head (which provides amenities including hot showers, cabins and a kiosk).

The park contains six picnic areas: Gummi Garra near Evans Head and Shark Bay, Old Ferry Crossing, Back Beach, Frazers Reef and Iluka Bluff on the Iluka Peninsula.

The north-eastern portion of the park contains an exclusion zone utilised by the RAAF as an active bombing range and public access is restricted.  The bombing range has been in use since World War II as a training facility for target practice.  Its existence predates the gazettal of the park and provides a mixed benefit in that it has preserved a large area that has been relatively untouched by human interference for many years.

See also
 Protected areas of New South Wales
 Mount Warning
 High Conservation Value Old Growth forest

References

Further reading
 Department of Environment and Conservation NSW: Bundjalung National Park, promotional flyer, 2006
 National Parks and Wildlife Service NSW : Broadwater National Park, Bundjalung National Park and Iluka Nature Reserve – Plan of Management. Sydney, August 1997.

External links
Bundjalung National Park

National parks of New South Wales
Protected areas established in 1980
1980 establishments in Australia